The most popular team sports in Greece are the football, the basketball, the volleyball, the water polo and the handball. The first four sports have a big tradition in Greece as well as have taken place official championships since the decade of twenties or thirties. The official handball championship commenced with delay, in 1980, but won popularity gradually.

In all of these sports, at least a Greek team has played in a final of European competition. The Greek teams have won at least a cup in European competition in four of these sports (basketball, volleyball, waterpolo, handball).

The Greek Football Federation founded in 1926 and the first official men's Greek football championship took place in 1927-28 season. These season started also the men's official basketball championship and the official water polo championship. The first official men's Greek volleyball championship started in 1936. The first official handball championship in 1979-80 season, when the Greek Handball Federation founded.

The oldest women's championship is the basketball championship which started in 1967-68 season. The women's volleyball championship started in 1969-70 season, the women's water polo championship started in 1987-88 season, the handball women's started in 1981-82 season and the football in 1989-90 season.

The most titles in the men's sport have won Olympiacos Piraeus and the next most successful club is Panathinaikos. Only two teams have won a title in the four different sports. These are Olympiacos and Aris Thessaloniki.

Men's competitions

Champions

Cup's Winners

League Cup's Winners

Super Cup's Winners

Women's competitions

Champions

Cup's winners

Super Cup's Winners

References

Teams
Teams